Madhura Swapnam is a 1982 Telugu-language film based on A. J. Cronin's novel, The Citadel. It was directed by K. Raghavendra Rao and stars Krishnam Raju, Jaya Prada and Jayasudha in the lead. The movie is also inspired by Yaddanapudi Sulochana Rani's novel of the same name. This is the remake of 1972 Bengali film Jiban Saikate.

Cast
Krishnam Raju
Jaya Prada
Jayasudha
Jaggayya
Kaikala Satyanarayana
Ranganath
Sarathi
Prabhakar Reddy
Giri Babu
Sakshi Ranga Rao
Chalapathi Rao
C.H. Narayana Rao
Potti Prasad
Nirmalamma
Baby Rohini

Soundtrack

References

External links
 

1982 films
Films directed by K. Raghavendra Rao
Films produced by Krishnam Raju
Films scored by Satyam (composer)
Films based on works by A. J. Cronin
Films based on novels by Yaddanapudi Sulochana Rani
Films based on American novels
Films based on Indian novels
Medical-themed films
Films set in India
1980s Telugu-language films
Telugu remakes of Bengali films
Films about tuberculosis